The Selma Enterprise is an American weekly paid newspaper which serves the city of Selma and surrounding Fresno County, California. It is published weekly on Wednesdays and its estimated circulation is 5,000.

The Selma Enterprise is edited by Jenny McGill.

History 
The Selma Enterprise was established in 1888 by V.I. & L.M. Willis as the Fresno County Enterprise.

In 1891, Selma Enterprise became a daily newspaper under the management of T.D. Calkins and H. K Farley.

P.F. Adelsbach was the proprietor and editor of the Enterprise in 1911. Adelsbach was offered 10,000 in gold to start a liquor paper (a paper supporting saloons' interests) and offer which he refused. In 1912, Adelsbach was severely beaten by C.H. Brynelson for an editorial comment Adelsbach made about Brynelson.

M.L. Atwater was editor of the paper in 1920.

Lowell Pratt was owner of the paper from 1926 to 1947. In 1929, Pratt became co-owner of the paper, when it was consolidated with the Selma Irrigator, which was owned by Edward Byfield. The co-owners, Pratt and Byfield, also purchased the Parlier Progress in 1929 and the Fowler Ensign in the 1930s. While he was owner of the paper, Pratt also served as postmaster of Selma for some time.

Pratt also gained national attention for articles he wrote criticizing a judge who Pratt thought handled a case with prejudice against Filipino defendants. He wrote that Japanese-Americans should be afforded the same rights as all American citizens, and that they should be safely returned to their homes from the internment camps where they were being held. Pratt sold the paper in 1947 and became the first director of public relations at San Jose State College (now San Jose State University).

In 1984, Roy Brock, publisher of the Selma Enterprise won the Justus F. Craemer Newspaper Executive of the Year Award from the California Press Foundation. He had been publisher of the paper since 1968. Roy's son, James Brock, who was also a publisher of the Enterprise and Recorder, won the same award in 1999. James Brock sold the two papers to Pulitzer Inc. in 2000. J. Randall McFarland, who had edited the paper since 1972 called the sale a "real shock."

The paper became part of Lee Central California Newspapers in 2013, part of Lee Enterprises, along with Hanford Sentinel, Lemoore Navy News, Kingsburg Recorder, and Santa Maria Times. Lee Central decided to combine the Selma Enterprise with the Kingsburg Recorder in July 2015, consolidating printing operations at the Santa Maria Times printing location.

Awards 
In 2016, the Selma Enterprise/Kingsburg Recorder won 1st place in the Agricultural Reporting category in its division of the California's Better Newspapers Contest.

References

Weekly newspapers published in California